Williemus Serverleg (fl. 1298) was an English Member of Parliament.

He was a Member (MP) of the Parliament of England for Lewes in 1298.

References

13th-century births
Year of death missing
English MPs 1298
People from Lewes